Diaphus confusus is a species of lanternfish found in the Southeast Pacific Ocean.

References

Myctophidae
Taxa named by Vladimir Eduardovich Becker
Fish described in 1992